Julia Davis (born 16 May 1974) is a Ukrainian-born American journalist and media analyst writing for the Daily Beast. She is best known for founding Russian Media Monitor, a project monitoring Russian state television, including its international outlets such as RT (formerly Russia Today). She has been described as the "foremost U.S. expert on Russian government-controlled television and propaganda". She has also been described as a "Russian TV whisperer for American ears". Regarding her founding of the Russian Media Monitor, she has stated that "it felt like a very natural thing that, when the U.S. is under such an attack from that part of the world, that with the unique experiences and skills I have, and the language, that I jump in and try to do something about it." She stated that:

During the 2022 Russian invasion of Ukraine, Russian Media Monitor has received attention for exposing some aggressive rhetoric on Russian television to international audiences, such as nuclear threats, as well as showing Russian media's prominent embrace of certain American personalities like Tucker Carlson and Tulsi Gabbard.

In 2022, she was sanctioned by the Russian government.

Davis was born in Soviet Ukraine. She has previously worked as a Russian disinformation expert for the Atlantic Council.

References

External links
Russian Media Monitor (site)

1974 births
Living people
American journalists
Ukrainian emigrants to the United States